Logansport Memorial Hospital is an 83-bed, HFAP-accredited, regional medical center providing healthcare services to residents in Logansport, Cass County, and the surrounding north central Indiana area.

History

The origin of the hospital goes back to its founding in 1925, when the formerly titled Cass County Hospital admitted its first patient on May 14. Staff included the first administrator – a woman, named Miss Harriet Jones – and also a graduate nurse, one bookkeeper, seven registered nurses, five undergraduate nurses, and a graduate physician. In July 1947, the hospital changed its name to Memorial Hospital, now better known today as Logansport Memorial Hospital.

As healthcare services have been upgraded through construction and technology, the original 1925 structure has been either torn down or renovated along the way. Today, the facility comprises two medical office buildings for physician practices, a comprehensive obstetrical unit known as the Family Birth Center, a wing of private inpatient rooms, a full-service surgery wing, emergency room, and a parking deck for patients, among other areas. Every area of Logansport Memorial Hospital is now modern and utilizes green technology wherever possible.

About

Logansport Memorial Hospital (LMH) is proud to be an independent, county-owned, not-for-profit hospital serving the communities in Cass and surrounding counties. LMH has integrated its physician practices into the Logansport Memorial Physician Network, and employs today more than 50 medical providers, including board-certified physicians, nurse practitioners, and other professionals. Consulting physicians are also included as part of the LMH medical staff in an effort to offer local alternatives for access to specialty care. As the 3rd largest employer in Cass County, LMH employs almost 600 full-time and part-time equivalent employees who deliver a wide range of services to patients.

Hospital Services

 Acute inpatient care
 Ambulatory surgery center
 Full spectrum of outpatient services
 On-site Laboratory
 Medical Imaging – CT, MRI, Ultrasound
 Respiratory Care – Cardiac and Pulmonary Rehabilitation
 Therapy services – Physical, Occupational, Speech
 Level II Emergency Room
 Health and Wellness
 Occupational Health

Logansport Memorial Physician Network Offices

 Ear Nose and Throat
 Family Medicine
 General Surgery
 Internal Medicine
 Obstetrics and Gynecology
 Orthopedics
 Pediatrics
 Pulmonology
 Urology

Facilities

Logansport Memorial Hospital

Medical Office Building West
1201 Michigan Avenue
Logansport, IN  46947

Medical Office Building East
1025 Michigan Avenue
Logansport, IN  46947

LMPN General Surgery
820 Fulton Street
Logansport, IN  46947

Clinic Locations

Express Medical Center
3400 E. Market Street
Logansport, IN  46947

Camden Health Center
132 West Main
Camden, IN  46917

Peru Medical Center
751 W 2nd Street, Suite 100
Peru, IN  46970

External links
 Official Website

References

Hospitals in Indiana